Ahasuerus (commonly Achashverosh; , in the Septuagint;  in the Vulgate) is a name applied in the Hebrew Bible to three rulers and to a Babylonian official (or Median king) in the Book of Tobit. It is a transliteration of either Xerxes or Artaxerxes; both are names of multiple Achaemenid dynasty Persian kings.

Etymology
The Hebrew form is believed to have derived from the Old Persian name of Xerxes I, Xšayāršā (< xšaya 'king' + aršan 'male' > 'king of all male; Hero among Kings'). That became Babylonian Aḥšiyaršu (aḫ-ši-ia-ar-šu) and then Akšiwaršu (ak-ši-i-wa6-ar-šu) and was borrowed into Hebrew as  Ăḥašwêrôš and thence into Latin as Ahasuerus, the form traditionally used in English Bibles.

The Persian name was independently rendered in Ancient Greek as  Xérxēs. Many newer English translations and paraphrases of the Bible have used the name Xerxes.

Biblical references

Book of Esther
"Ahasuerus" is given as the name of a king, the husband of Esther, in the Book of Esther. He is said to have “ruled over a hundred and twenty-seven provinces from India to Nubia" — that is, over the Achaemenid Empire. There is no reference to known historical events in the story; some consider the narrative of Esther was to provide an aetiology for Purim, and the name Ahasuerus is usually understood to refer to a fictionalized Xerxes I, who ruled the Achaemenid Empire between 486 and 465 BCE. Persian kings did not marry outside a restricted number of Persian noble families and it is unlikely that there was a Jewish queen Esther; in any case the historical Xerxes's queen was Amestris. In the Septuagint, the Book of Esther refers to the king as 'Artaxerxes,' who was the younger son of Xerxes.

Historical identification

Numerous scholars have proposed theories as to who Ahasuerus represents. Most scholars generally identify him with Xerxes I, as did 19th-century Bible commentaries. Three factors, among others, contribute to this identification:

 It is agreed the Hebrew 'Ahasuerus' descended from the Persian names for Xerxes I. 
 Historian Herodotus describes Xerxes I as being susceptible to women and in the habit of making extravagant offers to them, just as he did to Esther ("up to half my kingdom"). Herodotus mentions that the Persian empire stretched from India to Ethiopia and also refers to the magnificent royal palace in Shushan (Susa), corroboration of what is stated in the Book of Esther. In addition Herodotus mentions an assembly of Persian nobles called by Xerxes to advise him on the proposed war against Greece. Although Herodotus does not give the location of this assembly, the date – "after Egypt was subdued" – corresponds to Xerxes' third year when Esther records an assembly of Persian nobility at a feast. (Histories VII.8) Herodotus also mentions that following his defeat at Salamis Xerxes I became involved in harem intrigues involving his wife Amestris and his daughter-in-law, with whom he became enamoured. (Histories IX.108) Herodotus relates this occurred in the tenth month of his seventh year as king – the same time Ahasuerus was choosing beautiful women for his harem (Esther 2:16). 
 Annals from the reign of Xerxes I mention an otherwise unattested official by the name of "Marduka", which some have proposed refers to Mordecai, as both are mentioned serving in the king's court.

The Septuagint, the Vulgate, the Midrash of Esther Rabbah, I, 3 and the Josippon identify the king as Artaxerxes I, and the historian Josephus relates that this was the name by which he was known to the Greeks. The Ethiopic text calls him Arťeksis, usually the Ethiopic equivalent of Artaxerxes.

Book of Ezra

Ahasuerus is also given as the name of a King of Persia in the Book of Ezra. Modern commentators associate him with Xerxes I who reigned from 486 BCE until 465 BCE. Other identifications have been made for Cambyses II or with Bardiya (Greek Smerdis) who reigned (perhaps as an imposter) for seven months between Cambyses II and Darius I.

Book of Daniel

Ahasuerus is given as the name of the father of Darius the Mede in the Book of Daniel.  Josephus names Astyages as the father of Darius the Mede, and the description of the latter as uncle and father-in-law of Cyrus by mediaeval Jewish commentators matches that of Cyaxares II, who is said to be the son of Astyages by Xenophon. Thus this Ahasuerus is commonly identified with Astyages. He is alternatively identified, together with the Ahasuerus of the Book of Tobit, as Cyaxares I, said to be the father of Astyages. Views differ on how to reconcile the sources in this case. One view is that the description of Ahasuerus as the "father" of Darius the Mede should be understood in the broader sense of "forebear" or "ancestor." Another view notes that on the Behistun Inscription, "Cyaxares" is a family name, and thus considers the description as literal, viewing Astyages as an intermediate ruler wrongly placed in the family line in the Greek sources.

Most scholars view Darius the Mede as a literary fiction, or possibly a conflation of Darius the Great with prophecies about the Medes.

Book of Tobit
In some versions of the deuterocanonical Book of Tobit, Ahasuerus is given as the name of an associate of Nebuchadnezzar, who, together with him, destroyed Nineveh just before Tobit's death.  A traditional Catholic view is that he is identical to the Ahasuerus of Daniel 9:1 In the Codex Sinaiticus Greek (LXX) edition, the two names in this verse appear instead as one name, Ahikar (also the name of another character in the story of Tobit). Other Septuagint texts have the name Achiachar.  Western scholars have proposed that Achiachar is a variant form of the name "Cyaxares I of Media", who historically did destroy Nineveh, in 612 BCE.

In legends
In some versions of the legend of the Wandering Jew, his true name is held to be Ahasuerus – even though the Biblical King is not described as a Jew and nothing in the Biblical account of him is similar to that myth. This is the name by which Immanuel Kant refers to the Wandering Jew in The Only Possible Argument in Support of a Demonstration of the Existence of God.

Notes

References

Sources

External links

 

Ahasuerus
Babylonian captivity
Monarchs of the Hebrew Bible
Book of Daniel people
Book of Esther
Darius the Mede